"Get Her Back" is a 2014 song by Robin Thicke.

Get Her Back may also refer to:

 "Get Her Back", a 1980 song by Molly Hatchet from Beatin' the Odds
 "Get Her Back", a song from the soundtrack of the 2009 film Solomon Kane
 Get Her Back!, a 2011 novella by David Sherman